Bell's Life in London, and Sporting Chronicle was an English weekly sporting paper published as a pink broadsheet between 1822 and 1886.

History
Bell's Life was founded by Robert Bell, a London printer-publisher. Bell sold it to William Innell Clement, owner of The Observer, in 1824 or 1825, and the paper swallowed up a competitor, Pierce Egan's Life in London and Sporting Guide. From 1824 to 1852 it was edited by Vincent George Dowling, "during which time Bell's Life became Britain's leading sporting newspaper, without which no gentleman's Sunday was quite complete". Dowling's son, Frank Lewis Dowling, effectively edited the paper during the last year of his father's life, and succeeded him as editor from 1852 to 1867. By the 1860s Bell's Life was facing   competition from The Field, The Sportsman, Sporting Life, and The Sporting Times. In 1885 Edward Hulton bought Bell's Life and made it a daily, but in 1886 it was absorbed by Sporting Life.

Editorial policy
Though Bell's Life is now best known as a racing paper it began life as an anti-establishment general newspaper aimed at the working class. From around 1830 it gave increasing coverage to racing and this soon comprised more than a third of the paper, following general news and followed in its turn by other sporting news (notably boxing but all other sports too). For thirty years it remained the principal source of racing news while its general news with its acid comment, full coverage of scandal and cartoons provides an entertaining picture of Victorian Britain. Bell's problem was that it aimed at both the literate poor and the general sporting public who fall into all classes. It experimented variously with appearing more than once a week and eventually eliminated all its general news, covering sport alone; but the changes came too late.

Contributors
Contributors included:

 Francis Frederick Brandt
 agricultural writer Henry Corbet (1820–78)
 Charles Dickens
 Henry Hall Dixon
 angling writer Edward Fitzgibbon (1803–57)
 cricket writer Frederick Gale (1823–1904)
 W. H. Leverell
 card games writer Henry Jones (1831–1899)
 William Russell Macdonald (1787–1854)
 Rev. Charles Henry Newmarch (1824–1903)
 sports writer William Ruff (1801–56)
 Robert Smith Surtees
 chess writer George Walker (1803–79)
 John Henry Walsh
 Joseph Osborne "Beacon" author of The Horsebreeder's Handbook, owner/trainer of Grand National winner 1850/51

Notes and references

1822 establishments in England
Defunct newspapers published in the United Kingdom
Newspapers published in London
Publications established in 1822
Publications disestablished in 1886
Sport in England
Sports newspapers published in the United Kingdom
Weekly newspapers published in the United Kingdom
Defunct weekly newspapers
Bells Life